Magdalena Richter (born 7 July 1992) is a retired German footballer who played as a midfielder. Originally from Lüdinghausen, Richter has represented Germany at the student level on multiple occasions.

Career

Statistics

References

External links
 

1992 births
Living people
German women's footballers
Women's association football midfielders
Frauen-Bundesliga players
2. Frauen-Bundesliga players
VfL Bochum (women) players
MSV Duisburg (women) players
People from Lüdinghausen
Sportspeople from Münster (region)
Footballers from North Rhine-Westphalia